Bedford Tigers RLFC is a rugby league club based in Bedford, England. The first team plays in the Southern Conference, with a second team in the East Premier League. The Tigers are a fore running club in the amateur game in the south of England and continue to push boundaries of what can be achieved in the sport both on and off the field. As a club, Bedford Tigers have moved to their own ground in 2018 and boast two senior sides as well as two junior sides, a satellite programme and proposed schools program too.

History 
Rugby league was played in Bedford from 1997 until the summer of 2002 under the control of the Bedford Swifts rugby union club who operated a league team in the Rugby League Conference. However, the Swifts decided at the conclusion of the 2002 summer season to cease operations.

In 2004 Bedford Tigers RLFC was founded and competed in the London League. The Tigers only fielded one team but moved up into the Eastern Division of the Rugby League Conference in 2005.

In 2006 the Tigers first team were crowned champions of the Eastern Division after defeating St Ives Roosters in the regional grand final. A feat they replicated the following year too. The Tigers first team moved into the stronger Midlands Premier before trying the Rugby League Conference South Premier in 2009 and finished in fifth place.

In 2015 Tigers became "Triple Crown" Champions and secured the 2015 East RL league as well as East RL 9s and Cup double, a feat that has yet to be matched. This was by far the Tigers most successful season both on and off the field.

In 2016 Tigers Tigers came top of the East RL but lost in the play off final. However, they retained the East RL Cup and 9s trophies for the second year in a row. Tigers went on to become finalists in the league play off final in 2017 and 2018, retaining the East RL Cup again in 2017, and again in 2018 for an unprecedented fourth time in a row. In the five seasons from 2014 to 2018, Bedford Tigers had made the final of every competition they entered.

In 2019 Bedford Tigers gained inclusion into the new Southern Conference, the fourth tier of Rugby League, where on their debut season finished fourth.

In 2020 Bedford Tigers for the first time in their history, competed in the Challenge Cup away to 2019 Cumberland Cup winners Distington.

 2004 – Founded and competed in the LARL Merit League
 2005 – East Conference
 2006 – East Conference "Champions"
 2007 – East Conference "Champions"
 2008 – Midlands Premier – 4th
 2009 – Southern Premier – 5th
 2010 – East Conference – Runners up
 2011 – East Conference – 1st – Lost in Playoff Semi-final
 2012 – East Conference – 3rd – Lost in Playoff Semi-final
 2013 – East Premier – 3rd – Lost in Playoff Semi-final
 2014 - East Premier - 4th - Runners up
 2015 - East Premier - 1st - "Champions"
 2016 - East Premier - 1st - Runners up
 2017 - East Premier - 3rd - Runners up
 2018 - East Premier - 2nd - Runners up
 2019 - Southern Conference - 4th - Lost in Playoff Semi-Final

Community work 
In 2018 the Tigers set up the Bedfordshire Rugby League Foundation. The aim of the foundation is to tie all of the Tigers' community activity together. They have set up 3 other "Satellite Clubs", Ampthill Hornets, Dunstable Dragons and Luton Vipers with the aim of generating local junior activity and competition in the summer months. These clubs have U14 and U16 age ranges and provide the start of the player pathway to the Tigers senior squad.

Schools - The Tigers will launch school activity in 2018 by providing coaching and competition administration for local schools in the town and nearby areas.

Club officials
2004 – Andy Buckley (Chairman)
2005 – Andy Buckley (Chairman)
2006 – Phil Walker (Chairman) Andy Buckley (Secretary)
2007 – Phil Walker (Chairman) Andy Buckley (Secretary)
2008 – Phil Walker (Chairman) Rob Ashton and Andy Buckley (Secretary)
2009 – Phil Walker (Chairman) Rob Ashton and Andy Buckley (Secretary)
2010 – Graham Brown (Chairman and father of former Tigers player Jack Brown) Andy Buckley (Secretary)
2011 to present - Graham Brown

Mens coaches
2004 – Abe Kerr
2005 – Ian Flash Walker
2006 – Christopher Potts
2007 – Christopher Potts
2008 – Christopher Potts (Coach for first 3 games before resigning – Sam Richbell took over as coach for the remainder of the season)
2009 – Christopher Potts
2010 – Sam Richbell
2011 – Sam Richbell & Andy Champ
2012 – Rob Ashton
2015 - Rob Ashton & Richy Sinclair
2016 - Rob Ashton
2017 - Sam Richbell
2019 - Pat Wilson
2020 - Pat Wilson
2021 - Pat Wilson and Gaz Barron
2022 - Pat Wilson and Gaz Barron

Captains

Club captains (2004-2019)
2004 – N/A,
2005 – N/A,
2006 and 2007 – Sam Richbell,
2008 – Gary Flook,
2009 – N/A,
2010 – Rob Ashton,
2011 – Rob Ashton,
2012 - Rob Ashton,
2013 - Paul Ryder,
2014 - Sam Richbell,
2015 - Carl Siudak,
2016 - Lee Walker,
2017 - Paul Ryder,
2018 - Sean 'Treacle' Phimister,
2019 - Lee Walker
2020 - Sam Richbell
2021 - Sam Richbell
2022 - Matt Neild

Players who have captained the 1st team (2004-2019)
Abe Kerr (2004), Phil Walker (2004 & 2005), Ian Flash Walker (2006), Christopher Potts (2004–2008), Tony Pullen (2005), Dean Coleman (2005), Sam Richbell (2007–2009), Dave Rowling (2007), Jamie Goss (2008), Gary Flook (2009), Rob Ashton (2010–2012), Paul Ryder (2013), Sam Richbell (2014), Karl Siudak (2015), Lee Walker (2016), Paul Ryder (2017), Lee Walker (2018,19), Sam Richbell (2020/21), Matt Neild (2022)

Honours
East RL Premier Champions - 2006, '07,'15,
East RL Community Challenge Cup Winners - 2015, 2016, 2017, 2018
East RL 9s Winners - 2015, 2016,
East Entry League Champions - 2013, 2016 (Development Team)
East Merit League: 2012 Development Team (minor Premiers)
RLC National Grand Finalists – 2007 (Widnes Saints crowned Champions in the National Grand Final)
RLC South of England Champions – 2007 (After defeating the Plymouth Titans in the semi-final of the National Cup)
RLC Eastern Division: Champions – 2007 (Back to Back Championships!)
RLC Eastern Division: Champions – 2006
Sport Bedford Awards (Bedford County Council): Team of the Year – 2006
East RL Triple Crown Winners-2015

Representative Achievements
As of 02/11/2009

East Region Representatives
2005 – Christopher Potts, Tony Pullen and Shane Moulds
2006 – James Bull, Sam Richbell, Jamie Stead and Lee Clayton
2007 – Chris Aubury, Gary Flook (C), Dan Sharp, Simon Bevan, Matt Hughes and Stuart Riding
2008 – Chris Aubury and Rich Sinclair
2009 – N/A
2010 – N/A
2011 – Charlie Stafford, Sandro Parias, Craig Walker, Lee Walker, Rob Ashton, Scott Aspinall & Euan Irwin
2016-Carl Siudak, Sam Richbell, Jack Saunders, Ollie Fountain and Rob Ashton

South of England Representatives
2006 – Sam Richbell and Lee Clayton v London and South East and North of England (Origin match)
2007 – Gary Flook and Stuart Riding v North of England (Origin Match)
2007 – Chris Aubury v Royal Navy and RAF 
2008 – Rich Sinclair and Chris Aubury

England Lionhearts 'A' Representatives
2007 – Gary Flook

England Lionhearts Representatives
2002 – Ritchie Bower, David Cox and Mark Whybrow (Whilst playing for Bedford Swifts Rugby League)
2006 – Sam Richbell (training squad)
2008 – Rich Sinclair (V Scotland and V Ireland)
2008 – Matt Hughes (V Ireland)
2011 – Scott Aspinall (v Ireland and v Wales)

Other
Other notable representative achievements from Tigers players in the past include –

Jamie Goss and Lee Rossiter - Royal Navy, Combined Services, BARLA and GB Amateurs – 
Dean 'Digger' Coleman – Conference Dream Team selection in 2004
Marrick Murphy – Ireland Wolfhounds v Australia and v USA (2 caps and 3 tries)
Andy Wight – Scotland 9's team – London Nines 2006
Stuart Riding and Richie Sinclair – London 9's rep team – London Nines 2006
Simon Bevan – Wales 'A' representative 2003/2004
Rob Ashton – GB Fire Service representative
Toni Moliterno – Italian Exiles 2012
Rob Ashton- Services to Rugby League (recognized by The RFL) 2017

Records

Club records 1st XIII

Record Victory – 100 – 00 v Leicester Phoenix 2008 
Highest Score – 100 – 00, v Leicester Phoenix 2008 
Most tries in a game – 18 tries v Leicester Phoenix 2008

Individual records 1st XIII
As at season end 2014
Tries in a Season – 18 – Sam Richbell, 2014, Ollie Fountain, 2015, Sean 'Treacle' Phimister, 2018 
Tries in a Career – 45 – Sam Richbell 2005 – Present
Tries in a Match – 6 tries, Sam Richbell vs King's Lynn Black Knights (2015)
Tries on debut – 4 tries to Zander Pedan v Leicester Phoenix 2008
Youngest Try Scorer (1st Team) Bradley Hirons - 16 years 85 days vs SW London Chargers
Goals in a Season – 70 – Rob Ashton, 2015. 
Goals in a Career – 215 – Rob Ashton, 2006 – 2013
Goals in a Match – 14 – Chris Potts v Leicester Phoenix 2008 
Most Points in a Season – 164 – Rob Ashton, 2013 
Most Points in a Career – 534 – Rob Ashton, 2006 – Present
Most Points in a Match – 30 – Rob Ashton v MK Wolves 2013 (2 tries, 11 goals)
Most Appearances – 79 – Sam Richbell 2005 – Present

As of 2010 friendlies do not count towards statistics

Individuals records 2nd XIII / Development Side
Tries in a Match – 6 – Robert Harris v St Albans Centurions 2nds, 2007
Goals in a Match – 11 from 12 – Rob Ashton v St Albans Centurions 2nds, 2007
Points in a Match – 24 – Robert Harris v St Albans Centurions 2nds, 2007 (6T)

Women's team
Beginning in June 2021, Bedford Tigers will field a women's team to play in the inaugural season of the RFL Women's Super League South.

Seasons

References

2004 establishments in England
Sport in Bedford
Rugby League Conference teams
Rugby clubs established in 2004
Rugby league teams in Bedfordshire
English rugby league teams